An algebraic construction is a method by which an algebraic entity is defined or derived from another.

Instances include:

 Cayley–Dickson construction
 Proj construction
 Grothendieck group
 Gelfand–Naimark–Segal construction
 Ultraproduct
 ADHM construction
 Burnside ring
 Simplicial set
 Fox derivative
 Mapping cone (homological algebra)
 Prym variety
 Todd class
 Adjunction (field theory)
 Vaughan Jones construction
 Strähle construction
 Coset construction
 Plus construction
 Algebraic K-theory
 Gelfand–Naimark–Segal construction
 Stanley–Reisner ring construction
 Quotient ring construction
 Ward's twistor construction
 Hilbert symbol
 Hilbert's arithmetic of ends
 Colombeau's construction
 Vector bundle
 Integral monoid ring construction
 Integral group ring construction
 Category of Eilenberg–Moore algebras
 Kleisli category
 Adjunction (field theory)
 Lindenbaum–Tarski algebra construction
 Freudenthal magic square
 Stone–Čech compactification

Mathematics-related lists
Algebra